Industrial Magic is a fantasy novel by Canadian author Kelley Armstrong. The fourth book in the Women of the Otherworld series,  features the witch Paige Winterbourne.

Plot summary

The story starts with the attack upon Dana MacArthur, daughter of a Cabal employee. Dismayed by her inability to persuade other witches to form a new coven because of their disapproval of her relationship with Lucas Cortez, Paige Winterbourne is not entirely happy to find his father - Benicio Cortez - on her doorstep with news of the new case.

Lucas and Paige decide to travel to Miami to visit his father and introduce Paige to the family, as well as to hear further details about the attack. They discover that Dana's is only one of a series of similar attacks upon the children of Cabal employees. That night another child, the son of Benicio's bodyguard is killed. The father, Griffin, asks Paige and Lucas to investigate.

Concerned about Savannah, they arrange for her to stay with the werewolf Pack. They then arrange to meet up with Jaime Vegas, a necromancer. Jaime manages to contact Dana, who is believed to be in a coma, getting what details she can from her about the attack. In the process she discovers the girl is dead.

Investigation leads them to the home of Everett Weber. They are unable to find him, but do find a lot of encrypted computer files. Paige breaks the code to reveal a list of the children of Cabal employees. They track down Weber, but before they can persuade him to come with him peacefully, a Cabal SWAT team cause a hostage situation. Paige is injured and Everett taken into custody.

The trial results in Weber's swift execution, but almost immediately another child is killed - the grandson of Thomas Nast.

Jaime, Lucas and Paige go out to the swamp where Weber would be buried to contact him. They meet Esus. He gives them details about the man who hired Weber. When they continue to investigate, they start to be plagued by a ghost, but Jaime struggles to contact it. Eventually, they discover that the ghost is that of a vampire.

Their search leads them to the home of Edward and Natasha, two immortality-quester vampires. Natasha has been killed, she is the ghost, and Edward is looking for revenge. They set a trap, but it backfires. Lucas is shot, and both he and Paige find themselves in the land of the dead. There Paige meets Savannah's mother, Eve, who guides her. The Fates offer them a choice, and their decision returns them to the land of the living, where they find the werewolves have begun to search for them.

A trap is set for Edward at a charity ball, but it goes wrong. Jaime is kidnapped and Benicio ignores the plan in order to save his son. Jeremy, Savannah and Paige help to save everyone. Benicio executes Edward.

Characters

Major characters
 Lucas Cortez - Sorcerer, lawyer, and lover of Paige Winterbourne. Son of Benicio Cortez and heir of Cortez Cabal. 
 Paige Winterbourne - Witch and Former Head of American Coven. Lover of Lucas Cortez.
 Savannah Levine - 14-year-old witch and ward of Paige Winterbourne. Daughter of Eve Levine (Witch & Aspicio half Demon) & Kristof Nast (Sorcerer & heir to Nast Cabal)

Members of the Cortez Cabal
 Benicio Cortez - Head of Cortez Cabal and Father of Lucas
 Carlos Cortez - Youngest legitimate son of Benicio Cortez
 Delores Cortez - Wife of Benicio Cortez
 Dennis Malone - Half-Demon and Head of Cortez Cabal investigative unit
 Dorinda - Cortez Cabal Secretary
 Erin - Cortez Cabal Employee
 Faye Ashton - Clairvoyant
 Gloria - Cortez Cabal Employee
 Griffin - Ferratus Half-demon bodyguard of Benicio
 Hector Cortez - Eldest son of Benicio
 Jim - Half-Demon Cortez Cabal employee who previously worked for St Clouds.
 Morris - Half-demon bodyguard for Benicio.
 Randy MacArthur - Exaudio Half-Demon employed by Cortez Cabal
 Reuben Aldrich - Necromancer and Head of Actuarial Department
 Simon - Shaman working for Cortez Cabal
 Troy Morgan - Tempestras Half-demon employed by Benicio as bodyguard
 William Cortez - Middle son of Benicio Cortez

Other Characters
 Aaron - Vampire and former lover of Cassandra.
 Adam Vasic - Exustio Half-demon and friend of Paige.
 Brigid - Vampire
 Cassandra DuCharme - Vampire on Inter-Racial Council.
 Clayton Danvers - Werewolf and lover of Elena.
 Elena Michaels - Female werewolf and friend of Paige.
 Eve Levine - Witch, Aspicio Half-demon and mother of Savannah. Now dead.
 Esus - Druid deity. God of woodland and water.
 Fates, The - Deities in charge of the afterlife (see Moirai)
 Jaime Vegas - Necromancer
 Jeremy Danvers - Pack's Alpha Werewolf
 John - Vampire also known as Hans.
 Julie Aiken - Witch and younger sister of Wendy
 Lionel St Cloud - Head of St Cloud Cabal
 Natasha - Ghost vampire.
 Robert Vasic  - Half-demon, husband of Talia and stepfather of Adam.
 Ronald - Vampire.
 Sean Nast - Son of Kristof Nast and Savannah's half-brother.
 Talia Vasic - Mother of Adam and Wife of Robert.
 Thomas Nast - Head of Nast Cabal.
 Wendy Aiken - Witch

Death Toll
 Dana MacArthur - Witch, Daughter of Randy MacArthur
 Jacob - Son of Griffin
 Matthew Tucker - 19-year-old son of Lionel St Cloud's personal assistant
 Everett Weber - Druid and Cabal Computer specialist. Executed by Cabals after being found (incorrectly) guilty of attacks on Cabal children.
 Joey Nast - Grandson of Thomas Nast. Killed outside courthouse after Everett's execution.
 Tyler Boyd - 17-year-old son of Boyd Cabal CEO
 Stephen St Cloud - Son of Lionel St Cloud
 Edward - Vampire lover of the now deceased Natasha, both immortality questers.

Allusions/references to other works
Kelley Armstrong says the inspiration for the Cabals was "a cross between the Mafia and a corporation, kind of a tongue in cheek poke at corporate North America."
 Jaime is looking for a copy of Christine by Stephen King when she is attacked by copies of 'Salem's Lot and the Iliad.
 Mentioned obliquely as "that damned writer" (p. 302), Anne Rice and The Vampire Chronicles are blamed for the New Orleans vampires considering themselves to be 'special'.
 Michael Corleone of The Godfather movies is held up as a comparison to Lucas' own position within the Cortez cabal.

Allusions/references to actual history, geography and current science
 Esus, known in this novel as the god of woodland and water, was a Gaulish god known from two monumental statues and a line in Lucan's Bellum civile.
 The World Trade Center in New York City, which was one of the foci of the September 11, 2001 attacks is referred to (p. 240) as the home of the Nast Cabal's New York Office:
"Until last month, the Nasts' New York office was in the World Trade Center."
"Did they lose-?"
"Twenty-seven people, out of a staff of thirty-five..."

Awards and nominations
 Romantic Time Reviewers Choice Award 'Best Contemporary Paranormal'  2004

Critical reception
 "Set in a supernatural but credible underworld of industrial baron sorcerers and psychologically crippled witches... breakneck action is tempered by deep psychological insights, intense sensuality and considerable humor." - Publishers Weekly
 "Dark, snappy, and consistently entertaining... Armstrong never loses the balance  between Paige's sardonic narration, the wonderfully absurd supporting characters and the nicely girlie touches that add a little lightness to the murder and mayhem... There's never anything that could be described as a dull moment or filler for nearly 600 pages, that's quite an achievement. The series, in general, is developing into something more interesting and less predictable with every installment." -SF Crow's Nest
 "Armstrong's world is dangerous and fun, her voice  crisp and funny... a solidly engaging novel." -Contra Costa
 "Not to be missed. The action is fantastic and the drama is very intense." -Huntress Reviews
 "I found a lot to like in the humor and diversity of Armstrong's world." -Denver Post
 "Industrial Magic is a book not to be missed. The action is fantastic and the drama is very intense. Kelly Armstrong creates such fun characters that really jump off the pages. The book is fast paced with a lot of unexpected turns. Like the other books in the series, I wanted more after reading Industrial magic." -SFsite.com
 "One of Armstrong's strengths is the creation of plausible characters, which is a real bonus in a series based on the premise that there are supernatural beings walking and working beside us in our contemporary world. Industrial Magic is a page turner and very hard to put down." -Bookslut.com

References

External links
Author's website

2004 Canadian novels
Novels by Kelley Armstrong
Viking Press books